Linwood Historic District is a national historic district at Linwood, Carroll County, Maryland, United States.  The district includes a mixture of railway structures (grain elevator, freight station, site of demolished Western Maryland Railway station), community structures (general stores, post office, church, Sunday School hall/schoolhouse, site of blacksmith shop) and residences with rural dependencies (smokehouses, ice houses, windmills, sub-cellars). They date to the 19th and early-20th century and most structures relate to Linwood's role as a rail depot for the transportation of farm goods and supplies.

It was added to the National Register of Historic Places in 1980.

References

External links
, including photo from 2006, at Maryland Historical Trust
Boundary Map of the Linwood Historic District, Carroll County, at Maryland Historical Trust

Historic districts in Carroll County, Maryland
Historic districts on the National Register of Historic Places in Maryland
National Register of Historic Places in Carroll County, Maryland